Krasnaya Polyana (Gwbaadwy; , ‘atquaj) is an urban locality (an urban-type settlement) in Krasnopolyansky Settlement Okrug, which is under the administrative jurisdiction of Adlersky City District of the City of Sochi in Krasnodar Krai, Russia. Population: 

Located in the Western Caucasus, it is home to the new Rosa Khutor alpine ski resort, with a base elevation of  along the Mzymta River,  from its influx into the Black Sea in Adlersky City District of Sochi. The resort hosted the Alpine and Nordic events of the 2014 Winter Olympics in Sochi, having previously hosted World Cup alpine events from February 2012, two years earlier.

Etymology
The name "Krasnaya Polyana" (lit. Red Glade) was given by the Greek settlers in 1878 because of the thick overgrowth of fern, the leaves of which had a reddish-brown color in fall. Walter Richmond, a historian of the Circassian genocide, notes that Krasnaya Polyana was named after the last stand by the Abkhaz Akhchipsou tribe, of whom many died there in 1864.

History
Although the vicinity is rich in prehistoric dolmens and contains ruins of about twenty medieval forts, the settlement first appears in recorded history in 1835, when a Russian spy, Baron Fyodor Tornau, visited the Sadz Abkhazian village of Artquaj in the guise of a Circassian mountaineer. Having spent several days in the village, he recorded his observations in a journal. 

By the 1860s, the village was known as Kbaade and became populated with the Akhchipsou branch of the Sadz. In 1864, the area was the scene, significant in Circassian history, of the last battles of the Russian–Circassian War. The area was conquered by four main Russian armies and the end of the prolonged Caucasian War declared (on June 2, 1864). The area became a part of the Russian Empire and those residents who did not swear allegiance to the Empire were removed to the Ottoman Empire. The abandoned aul was replaced with the new settlement of Krasnaya Polyana in 1869.

On June 19, 1899, Krasnaya Polyana was visited by an official commission under Nikolay Abaza, with a view to transforming it into Tsarskaya Polyana, Nicholas II's hunting ground in the Western Caucasus. A royal hunting lodge was erected in 1901, followed by the chalets of Counts Sheremetev and Bobrinsky, among other nobles and high-placed dignitaries. Although it was never visited by the Tsar, the village was renamed Romanovsk, after the ruling imperial dynasty. 

Following the October Revolution of 1917, the retreat reverted to its former name and status and gradually dwindled into obscurity. The proximity to Sochi, the "summer capital" of Russia, eventually revived its fortunes in the last quarter of the 20th century, when it achieved a modicum of popularity across the former Soviet Union, despite limited hotel capabilities and installations, and difficulty of access through narrow mountain passes.

Climate

Location and facilities

The settlement has been plagued by transport problems: in order to improve this for the 2014 Winter Olympics, a railway line was built, connecting the area with the airport, Sochi Olympic Village, and central Sochi.

Structures
An electricity pylon looking like a snow leopard .

Economy
The economic activity in the village is based on serving tourists and visitors in winter and summer. Krasnaya Polyana is a skiing and snowboarding center.

2014 Olympics venues

Sanki Sliding Center, luge, bobsled, and skeleton (moved to Rzhanaya Polyana in May 2009)
Laura Cross-Country ski and Biathlon Center, biathlon, cross-country skiing, and Nordic combined
Rosa Khutor Alpine Resort, alpine skiing
Rosa Khutor Extreme Park, freestyle skiing, snowboarding
RusSki Gorki Jumping Center, ski jumping and Nordic combined

References

 History of Krasnaya Polyana on the Alpika Service website
 Article about Krasnaya Polyana in the Sankt-Peterburgskiye Vedomosti

External links

 Krasnaya Polyana
 Красная Поляна
 Krasnaya Polyana photos
 Krasnaya Polyana tourist information

Urban-type settlements in Krasnodar Krai
Adlersky City District
Venues of the 2014 Winter Olympics
Ski areas and resorts in Russia